The 2021 New Mexico wildfire season began in February 7, 2021. As of July 7, there have been at least 363 fires across the state that have burned at least .

Early outlook
In line with general predictions of a ‘very active wildfire season’ for the Western United States, state and local officials in New Mexico expect a particularly severe wildfire season for the state, citing effects of the ongoing drought conditions that make vegetation more susceptible to fires. Southwest Coordination Center Predictive Services forecasted an 'above normal' risk for significant wildland fires for May and June for the entire state, with fire potential returning to 'normal' by July with the timely arrival of a normal to above-normal monsoon.

List of wildfires

See also 

 2021 Arizona wildfires
 2021 Colorado wildfires

References

2021 New Mexico wildfires
Lists of wildfires in the United States